Democratic Union for the New Republic (UDNR), usually referred to as New Republic (Nuova Repubblica, NR) was a short-lived political party in Italy founded on 1 March 1964 by Randolfo Pacciardi, a former leading member of the Italian Republican Party (PRI).

History
In 1963, Randolfo Pacciardi had been expelled by the PRI after he had voted against the first Italian centre-left government, which was supported by his party. A few months later, in March 1964, he founded the Democratic Union for the New Republic. The party, which was inspired by Charles de Gaulle's party in France, included several post-fascists such as Enzo Dantini and Antonio Aliotti, from the National Vanguard, and future member of Christian Democracy Vittorio Sbardella. New Republic thus had a right-wing connotation. Its main goals were to transform Italy into a presidential republic and to introduce a plurality voting system.

Connected to New Republic was the university movement Primula Goliardica, later absorbed by Lotta di Popolo. The party's journals were Folla (since 1964) and  Nuova Repubblica (since 1966). In 1980 Pacciardi and his followers, whose electoral results had been dismal, returned to the PRI.

Election results

Chamber of Deputies

References

Defunct political parties in Italy
Political parties established in 1964
Political parties disestablished in 1980
1964 establishments in Italy
1980 disestablishments in Italy
Conservative parties in Italy